Castle Mountain is a ski resort located in the Westcastle Valley of southwest Alberta, Canada in the Rocky Mountains. The resort is renowned for long steep runs and an average  of snowfall yearly.

The name is derived from the Castle Rivers, and the nearby Windsor Mountain. Windsor Mountain was originally named by the Blakiston group of the Palliser Expedition as Castle Mountain, within days of the naming of the Banff peak by the Palliser group of the Palliser Expedition. The name was changed to Windsor Mountain due to its shape and visible 'towers', which are still named as the Castle Peaks, which resemble Windsor Castle.

The resort maintains 78 ski trails including 8 alpine bowls, with 15% beginner, 40% intermediate, 35% advanced, 10% expert terrain. Six lift systems with vertical rises from 445 to 50 m with the highest vertical being 863 m, are operated on the slopes of Mount Haig and Gravenstafel Ridge.

Castle Mountain Resort was opened in 1965. It was the site of the 1975 Canada Winter Games.

References

External links
Castle Mountain Resort Website

Municipal District of Pincher Creek No. 9
Ski areas and resorts in Alberta